William Tell is a 1923 German silent adventure film directed by Rudolf Dworsky and Rudolf Walther-Fein and starring Hans Marr, Conrad Veidt, and Erich Kaiser-Titz. The film portrays the story of the legendary Swiss national hero William Tell. The sets were designed by Rudi Feld. It premiered at the Marmorhaus in Berlin.

Cast

See also
William Tell (1934 film), also with Hans Marr and Conrad Veidt

References

External links

1920s historical adventure films
German historical adventure films
Films of the Weimar Republic
German silent feature films
Films directed by Rudolf Dworsky
Films directed by Rudolf Walther-Fein
Films set in Switzerland
Films set in the 14th century
Cultural depictions of William Tell
German black-and-white films
Silent historical adventure films
1920s German films
1920s German-language films